Andrea Nagy (born November 16, 1971) is a retired professional basketball player. After a stand-out career playing at Florida International University, Nagy was drafted into the ABL before finishing her career in the WNBA playing as a point guard.

College 

Nagy attended Florida International University (FIU), where she played from 1991 to 1995. She is considered one of the greatest players in the school's history, and one of three players with a jersey retired by the Panthers. She helped FIU to two NCAA Tournament appearances, and finished with career averages of 14.5 points, 3.6 rebounds, and 9.4 assists – the fourth-best assist average in NCAA history.

Her 1,136 assists are the second best in NCAA history and an FIU record. Nagy ranks fourth in school history, with 1,812 career points. She led the nation in 1994 with 10.3 assists per game and was selected first-team All-America by Kodak, the United States Basketball Writers' Association, and USA Today. Named to the Atlantic Sun Conference's 25th Anniversary Team, she is one of five former players and coaches inducted into the inaugural class of the FIU Hall of Fame on November 17, 2006.

Professional 
In 1996, Seattle selected Nagy in the fourth round of the ABL Draft. She played in 39 games and finished second on the team in assists (113), fifth in steals (34), and ninth in scoring (3.8). In 1997, she played for Long Beach, leading the Stingrays to the finals. She finished third in the league in assists (273) and averaged 7.6 points per game.

Nagy was selected by the Washington Mystics in the third round (25th overall) of the 1999 WNBA draft. In two seasons with the Washington Mystics, she started every game she played. Highlights of the 2000 season were ten-assist performances against Sacramento and a fifth-place finish in assists (118). She started 23 games, averaging 4.2 points, 2.7 rebounds, and 5.1 assists. In 1999, she started all 32 games, finishing seventh in the league in assists, averaging 4.6 per game. She  averaged 5.1 points and shot 76.3 percent from the free throw line.

Nagy was traded to New York Liberty along with the 57th pick in the 2001 WNBA draft for the 28th and 44th picks in the 2001 WNBA draft. She was traded by the New York Liberty to the Sacramento Monarchs at beginning of 2002 season in exchange for the 2003 second round draft pick on April 22, 2002. She started eight games with the Monarchs, averaging three assists per game in 24 appearances, ranking her third in the league with 7.1 assists per 40 minutes average.

Nagy played professionally for seven seasons before retiring in 2003.

International 
Nagy played as starting point guard for the MTK in Hungary, where she won the 1991 Hungarian Championship. She played as point guard for the 1991 Hungarian Women's National Basketball Team that won the bronze medal at the European Championship. She played as starting point guard for the 1995–1996 Strasbourg team in France. She played as starting point guard for the 1999 Fenerbahçe Istanbul team in Turkey, where she won the Turkish Cup, Turkish President's Cup, and the Turkish Championship.

WNBA career highlights 
 Ranked #9 in the WNBA in assists per 40 minutes (6.7)
 Scored 12 points at Los Angeles in 1999
 Six rebounds vs. Cleveland in 1999
 Twelve assists vs. Charlotte in 1999
 Made six three-point field goals at Los Angeles in 2000
 Led the Washington Mystics in total assists (118) and was fifth in the league in assists per game (5.1) in 2000

Honors 
 Trans America Athletic Conference All-Tournament Team (1992, 1993, 1994, 1995)
 Associated Press All-America (1995 3rd Team)
 Fast Break Magazine Freshman All-America (1992)
 FIU Inaugural Hall of Fame inductee (2006)
 Kodak All-America (1994)
 Trans America Athletic Conference Newcomer of the Year (1992)
 Trans America Athletic Conference Player of the Year (1994)
 Trans America Athletic Conference Tournament MVP (1992, 1993, 1994, 1995)
 Trans America Athletic Conference All-Conference First Team (1992, 1993, 1994, 1995)
 U.S. Basketball Writers Association All-America (1994, 1995)
 USA Today All-America (1994)
 Women's Basketball News Service All-America (1995)
 Women's Basketball News Service Freshman All-America (1992)

WNBA player stats

See also 
 List of NCAA Division I women's basketball career assists leaders

References

External links 
 Profile on wnba.com
 Florida International University Bio
 Hall of fame press release

1971 births
Living people
All-American college women's basketball players
Fenerbahçe women's basketball players
Hungarian women's basketball coaches
Hungarian women's basketball players
FIU Panthers women's basketball coaches
FIU Panthers women's basketball players
Long Beach Stingrays players
New York Liberty players
Philadelphia Rage players
Point guards
Sacramento Monarchs players
Seattle Reign (basketball) players
Washington Mystics draft picks
Washington Mystics players
Basketball players from Budapest